The 2024 Puerto Rico gubernatorial election will be held on November 5, 2024, to elect the governor of Puerto Rico, concurrently with the election of the Resident Commissioner, the Senate, the House of Representatives, and the mayors of the 78 municipalities. Incumbent New Progressive Party Governor Pedro Pierluisi Urrutia is running for re-election to a second term in office, while resident commissioner Jennifer González Colón has been identified as a potential primary challenger.

The Popular Democratic Party is expected to have a primary, as several potential candidates have voiced interest in the position. A similar situation could take place in Project Dignity, with at least two candidates expressing interest in the position. Meanwhile, the Puerto Rican Independence Party and Citizens' Victory Movement have engaged in talks about an electoral alliance, which could affect how they nominate candidates for several positions, including the governorship.

New Progressive primary
On March 20, 2022, during the New Progressive Party's general assembly, governor Pedro Pierluisi announced that he would run for a second term. In an interview on August 28, he reaffirmed the press that he would be in fact running again, stating that "Puerto Rico is moving forward and there is no one who can stop us" and that they were "going to beat the PDP".

Candidates

Declared
 Pedro Pierluisi, incumbent governor

Potential 
As of February 2023, the following individuals have been subjects of speculation about their potential candidacy, and included in polling for the position:
 Jenniffer Aydín González Colón, Resident Commissioner of Puerto Rico

Polling

Popular Democratic primary
After their defeat in the 2020 elections, the Popular Democratic Party suffered a major divide on opinions, from the topic of abortion to what political status should the party pursue in the case of a 8th plebiscite. Some like the current party president José Luis Dalmau say that the party should keep supporting the current political status (ELA), while others within the party like former senator Marco Rigau Jiménez stated that the party should move towards Free Association.

On June 16, 2022, while criticizing the party president José Dalmau, Morovis mayor Carmen Maldonado González challenged him, and announced that she would be running for governor. Later, on October 17, she officialized her candidacy in an press conference.

Senator Juan Zaragoza Gómez announced his candidacy for governor during a press conference on September 13, 2022, saying that "If God gives me health, I'm going there". Zaragoza previously had announced that he would run for governor in the 2020 election, before withdrawing his candidacy to run as senator at-large.

Candidates

Declared 
 Carmen Maldonado González, mayor of Morovis
 Juan Zaragoza, at-large territorial senator and former Puerto Rico Secretary of Treasury

Potential 
 Jose Luis Dalmau, president of the Puerto Rican Senate and president of the Popular Democratic Party
 Carlos Delgado Altieri, former mayor of Isabela and nominee for governor in 2020

Polling

Project Dignity primary

Candidates

Declined 
 Joanne Rodríguez Veve, at-large territorial senator

Other Candidates

Puerto Rican Independence Party

Declared 
 Juan Dalmau, former at-large territorial senator and nominee for governor in 2020

See also
2024 United States gubernatorial elections

Notes

References

2024
Governor
Puerto Rico